Commidendrum spurium, the false gumwood,  is a species of flowering plant in the family Asteraceae. It is found only in Saint Helena. Its natural habitats are subtropical or tropical moist lowland forests, rocky areas, and rocky shores. It is threatened by habitat loss.

References

spurium
Critically endangered plants
Flora of Saint Helena
Taxonomy articles created by Polbot
Plants described in 1836